The Academy of Performing Arts Baden-Wuerttemberg (German: Akademie für Darstellende Kunst Baden-Württemberg) is a public drama school in Ludwigsburg, Germany. Founded in 2007 on the campus of the Film Academy Baden-Wuerttemberg. The Academy of Performing Arts offers an interdisciplinary education, combining acting for theater and film.

References

External links
 Academy of Performing Arts Baden-Wuerttemberg

Drama schools in Germany
Performing arts education
Universities and colleges in Baden-Württemberg
Ludwigsburg
2007 establishments in Germany